Alhambra is an extinct town in Stoddard County, in the U.S. state of Missouri.

A post office called Alhambra was established in 1902, and remained in operation until 1909. The community took its name from Alhambra fortress in Spain.

References

Ghost towns in Missouri
Former populated places in Stoddard County, Missouri
1902 establishments in Missouri